Barbara Dirikson is an American actress known for providing the voice of fairy Flora since 2005.

Career
Barbara has appeared in many television series including, Great Performances, Lou Grant, Northern Exposure, and The Fugitive. She also appeared in many TV movies including The Taming of the Shrew, Faces of a Stranger, and Joyful Partaking. She is also the current voice actress for Flora, one of the three good fairies, in Disney Princess Enchanted Tales: Follow Your Dreams, Kingdom Hearts video-game series and Sofia the First. Following the death of Russi Taylor in 2019, she takes over the role as Fairy Godmother starting with Kingdom Hearts III.

Filmography

References

External links
 

Living people
American film actresses
American stage actresses
American television actresses
American video game actresses
American voice actresses
Place of birth missing (living people)
Year of birth missing (living people)
20th-century American actresses
21st-century American actresses